Senator Butler may refer to:

Members of the United States Senate
Andrew Butler (1796–1857), U.S. Senator from South Carolina from 1846 to 1857
Hugh A. Butler (1878–1954), U.S. Senator from Nebraska from 1941 to 1954
John Marshall Butler (1897–1978), U.S. Senator from Maryland from 1951 to 1963
Marion Butler (1863–1938), U.S. Senator from North Carolina from 1895 to 1901
Matthew Butler (1836–1909), U.S. Senator from South Carolina from 1877 to 1895
Pierce Butler (American politician) (1744–1822), U.S. Senator from South Carolina from 1789 to 1796
William M. Butler (1861–1937), U.S. Senator from Massachusetts from 1924 to 1926; also served in the Massachusetts State Senate

United States state senate members
Albert Butler (fl. 2010s), Mississippi State Senator
Benjamin Butler (1818–1893), Massachusetts State Senate
David Butler (politician) (1829–1891), Nebraska State Senate
Fred M. Butler (1854–1932), Vermont State Senate
Gloria S. Butler (born 1941), Georgia State Senate
Homer M. Butler (1904–1982), Illinois State Senate
Kelvin Butler (born 1956), Mississippi State Senate
Marty Butler (1924–1998), Illinois State Senate
Robert R. Butler (1881–1933), Oregon State Senate
Roderick R. Butler (1827–1902), Tennessee State Senate
Thomas B. Butler (1806–1873), Connecticut State Senate
Thomas H. Butler (1819–1889), Tennessee State Senate
Tom Butler (Alabama politician) (born 1944), Alabama State Senate
Walker Butler (1898–1969), Illinois State Senate